Gynophobia or gynephobia is a morbid fear of women, a type of specific social phobia.   In the past, the Latin term horror feminae was used.

Gynophobia should not be confused with misogyny, the hatred, contempt for and prejudice against women, although some may use the terms interchangeably, in reference to the social, rather than pathological aspect of negative attitudes towards women.  The antonym of misogyny is philogyny, the love, respect for and admiration of women.

Gynophobia is analogous with androphobia, the extreme and/or irrational fear of men.  A subset of gynophobia is caligynephobia, or the fear of beautiful women.

Etymology
The term gynophobia comes from the Greek γυνή - gunē, meaning "woman" and  φόβος - phobos, "fear".

Hyponyms of the term "gynophobia" include feminophobia.

Ancient mythology

Woman as mysterious vessel and fearsome goddess
In ancient mythology, the idea of woman as a, "mysterious, magical body-vessel", or "intimidating Great Goddess" is common.  In these myths, woman (sometimes also depicted as a Great World Tree, pomegranate, poppyhead, or mountain) bears all living things, and empties them out of herself into the living world.  In the "vessel" analogy, the inside of the vessel is unknown, and all body orifices are special zones, each regarded as idols by artistic representation.  The historical permanence of woman as body-vessel, is sometimes artistically depicted to elicit fear.  For example, Albert Dubout depicted the Great Goddess as eliciting fear from a short man simply by displaying her large breasts and noting that her breasts survived World War II.

In India, the goddess "Kali the Terrible" is the mother of the world and a fearsome, gruesome, and bloodthirsty destroyer of human life.  She partially expresses her destruction through a wide array of female avatars (or "agents").  Kali's avatars and agents are regarded by believers as responsible for serious maladies such as typhoid fever, whooping cough, epilepsy, delirium, and convulsions. For example, Kali's agent goddess Vasurimala is mythologized as responsible for smallpox and cholera.  Believers in the rural Indian town of Cranganore, make symbolic monetary offerings to Kali, to fulfill promises made in fear of being stricken with smallpox or cholera.

Woman as "Great Goddess" was often depicted as a goddess of death in ancient Greek mythology as well.  For example, in ancient Greek mythology, at least 7 female goddesses are depicted as both nursing mothers and as queens of the dead.

Case studies
In his book Sadism and Masochism: The Psychology of Hatred and Cruelty, Wilhelm Stekel  discusses horror feminae of a male masochist.

Proposed possible causes

Envy of mother's genitals
In The Dread of Woman (1932), Karen Horney proposed that gynophobia may be partially due to a boy's fear that his genital is inadequate in relation to the mother.  She also remarked that she was surprised at the lack of explicit recognition of gynophobia, after she allegedly found ample historical, clinical, mythological, and anthropological evidence of gynophobia.

Differences in gendered-morality, and female hostility toward societal ideals
The author of The Fear of Women, Wolfgang Lederer, makes the argument in his book that gynophobia is partially the result of men and women allegedly having different attitudes toward societally-based morality.  He argues that women were mostly absent and also sometimes explicitly excluded from the meaningful aspects of the creation of society.  He further argues that this contributes to what he sees as historically-universal female hostility toward societal goals such as justice, goals which exist outside practical and immediate interpersonal affairs.   Wolfgang argues that this is not just his idea, but projected into religion through all historical communities that have both a father-deity and a mother-deity, where, he argues, the mother-deity is always morally indifferent. 

Because Wolfgang thinks that men generally have societal ideals, while women generally do not, Wolfgang argues that 'real' women 'intrude obstinately and necessarily' on an imagined ideal of women that men have of them.  He states that this births a male fear that women will forever, or sooner or later, be his disappointment.

Basic resource access barriers and population expansion limitations
Extreme examples of universal, cultural gypnohobia have been found in the highlands of New Guinea, where widespread anti-masturbation propaganda coincides with notions of, "perilous female sexuality".  The anthropologist Carol Ember argues that such fears were likely caused by limited availability of basic resources that would be required to increase the population.

See also

List of phobias

References

Women in society
Phobias
Sexology